Cymindis alluaudi is a species of ground beetle in the subfamily Harpalinae. It was described by Antonie in 1939.

References

alluaudi
Beetles described in 1939